
Year 228 BC was a year of the pre-Julian Roman calendar. At the time it was known as the Year of the Consulship of Ruga and Verrucosus (or, less frequently, year 526 Ab urbe condita). The denomination 228 BC for this year has been used since the early medieval period, when the Anno Domini calendar era became the prevalent method in Europe for naming years.

Events 
 By place 

 Carthage 
 The Carthaginian general Hamilcar Barca is killed in a battle in Hispania, ending his lengthy campaign to conquer the Iberian Peninsula for Carthage. In eight years, by force of arms and diplomacy, he has secured an extensive territory in the Iberian Peninsula, but his death in battle prevents him from completing the conquest. Command of his army in the Iberian Peninsula passes to his son-in-law Hasdrubal.
 Hasdrubal makes immediate policy changes, emphasizing the use of diplomatic rather than military methods for expanding Carthaginian Hispania and dealing with Rome. He founds Carthago Nova or New Carthage (modern Cartagena) as his capital city.

 Asia Minor 
 King Attalus I Soter of Pergamum defeats Antiochus Hierax (brother of the Seleucid king Seleucus II) in three battles and thereby gains control over all the Seleucid domains in Anatolia except Cilicia in the southeast.

 Greece 
 The Illyrian Queen Teuta's governor, Demetrius of Pharos has little alternative but to surrender to the overwhelming Roman force. In return, the Romans award him a considerable part of Teuta's holdings to counter-balance the power of Teuta. Meanwhile, the Roman army lands farther north at Apollonia. The combined Roman army and fleet proceed northward together, subduing one town after another and besieging Shkodra, the Illyrian capital.
 Archidamus V, brother of the murdered Spartan King Agis IV, is called back to Sparta by the Agiad King Cleomenes III, who has no counterpart on the throne by then. However, Archidamus V is assassinated shortly after returning.

 China 
 The State of Qin, its armies led by Wang Jian, completes the conquest of the State of Zhao.
 The remnants of the Zhao monarchy form a remnant state in Dai.

Births

Deaths 
 Ai of Chu, king of the Chu State (Warring States Period)
 Archidamus V, king of Sparta of the Eurypontid line
 Arsames I, king of Armenia, Sophene and Commagene
 Hamilcar Barca, Carthaginian general who has assumed command of the Carthaginian forces in Sicily during the last years of the First Punic War with Rome, helped Carthage win the Mercenary War and brought extensive territory in the Iberian Peninsula under Carthaginian control (b. c. 270 BC)
 You of Chu, king of the Chu State (Warring States Period)

References